Gurvanbayan  (Three riches, also Khurkh ) is a settlement in the Ömnödelger sum (district) of Khentii Province in eastern Mongolia. Settlement population is 1,019 (2009).

Gurvanbayan is an arable farming settlement.  It was the center of the former Gurvanbayan sum.  There is a hospital in this settlement.

References 

Populated places in Mongolia